Kamijo is a Japanese singer-songwriter, musician, and music producer. He is best known as lead singer of the visual kei bands Lareine and Versailles. He has also been the head of two independent record labels; the first being Applause Records (formed in 2000), and currently Sherow Artist Society since 2006, being renamed to Chateau Agency since 2016. His music covers many genres, Lareine having mainly a baroque pop style, and Versailles a clear symphonic and neoclassical metal sound. He has an extensive discography with the bands Lareine, New Sodmy and Versailles, consisting of 15 albums, and a large amount of EPs and singles. In 2013, Kamijo began a solo career with his debut single "Louis ~Enketsu no La Vie en Rose~".

Early life
Kamijo was raised in a family of musicians; his mother and grandmother were both piano players, and his grandfather a violinist. He has cited Paul Mauriat and X Japan as influences. His first steps in rock music were in the mid-1990s, when he worked as a roadie for the visual kei rock band Malice Mizer. He shared this job with Mayu, a guitarist with whom he formed the band Lareine.

Career

1994–2007: Lareine

In August 1994, Mayu and Kamijo (then using the names Maito and Shoki respectively) met for the first time while they were working as roadies for Malice Mizer. The same year, in November, they decided to form a band together, which they named Laliene ru cheri, commonly called just Laliene (named that way for the French Queen Marie Antoinette). Along with guitarist Sakuren and drummer Kyouka, they began to play. Later bass player Emiru entered the band, completing the first line-up.

In March 1996, Laliene held a live concert for their first anniversary, where they changed the name of the band to Lareine. That same year they released their first recording "Saikai no Hana", distributed freely at the anniversary concert in a limited number of 100 copies. They signed with Sony in 1998 and released the songs Metamorphose, Fiançailles, Fuyu Tokyo and Lillie Charlotte. After many years of releasing many albums, EPs and singles, during a short separation of the band, Kamijo created the band New Sodmy, and recorded two albums and five singles.
New Sodmy disbanded while Lareine was reformed in 2003 and started releasing new material.

In February 2007, Lareine finally came to its end, having played their last live on October 31, 2006. The last recording of Lareine consists of 10 piano versions of their most popular songs.

2007–2012: Versailles

In March 2007, Kamijo and Hizaki (ex-Sulfuric Acid), and Jasmine You (ex-Jakura), formed the band Versailles. Later, Teru (ex-Aikaryu) and Yuki (ex-Sugar Trip), who were recommended by the Rock May Kan venue in Tokyo, joined the band. Hizaki, Jasmine You and Teru previously played together as part of Hizaki Grace Project.

Kamijo and Hizaki created the concept of Versailles in the autumn of 2006 and spent six months gathering members to express it. Their band concept is "the absolute youshikibi (beauty of form) sound and extremes of aestheticism". On March 30, 2007 the details of the band were announced. They released promotional material through the internet, set up an English language page on MySpace, and had several interviews with foreign press. Versailles made their first appearance with a showcase on June 23, followed by their first performance on June 24. On these dates they also distributed their first single and DVD single, "The Revenant Choir".

The band signed with the German CLJ Records label and released the EP Lyrical Sympathy on October 31, both in Japan and Europe. Their song "The Love From A Dead Orchestra" also appeared on a compilation album released by Sony BMG in Germany on November 9, called Tokyo Rock City. On September 23, 2008, Kamijo modeled clothing for the brand Alice and the Pirates on the runway at Individual Fashion Expo IV.

In January 2011, he and the rest of Versailles started starring in their own TV mini drama called . The show also starred Rina Koike and aired on Mainichi Broadcasting System and TV Kanagawa until March. On December 20, 2012, Versailles gave their last concert and ceased all activities. The band released four albums, one EP, eight singles, two live albums, ten music videos, one compilation albums and several DVDs.

2013: Solo career

In January 2013, Kamijo announced he would start a solo career, with his first release being the single "Louis ~Enketsu no La Vie en Rose~" on August 28. While all the other members of Versailles later formed the band Jupiter with a new singer, and released their first album the same day as Kamijo's single. The music video for Kamijo's single features Malice Mizer and Moi dix Mois leader Mana.

Kamijo also sang backup on the 2013 debut album Heartstrings by Aisenshi, the new band of Eizo Sakamoto (Anthem) and She-Ja (Volcano).

In September 2018, Kamijo was one of three guest vocalists who performed with Malice Mizer for their 25th anniversary reunion concerts.

Discography

Solo
Studio albums
 Symphony of the Vampire (March 5, 2014; mini-album)
 Heart (September 24, 2014)
 Sang (March 21, 2018)
 Oscar (October 23, 2022)

Other albums
 
 Royal Blood -Revival Best- (July 15, 2015; self-cover album)
 Dream Live "Symphony of The Vampire" Kamijo with Orchestra (July 17, 2019; live album)

Singles
 
 "Moulin Rouge" (June 18, 2014)
 
 
 "Mademoiselle" (September 27, 2017)
 "Nosferatu" (January 16, 2018)
 "Sang~Another Story" (March 21, 2018)
 
 "Eye of Providence" (July 24, 2019)
 "Temple ~Blood-sucking for Praying~" (November 27, 2019)
 "Symbol of the Dragon" (February 26, 2020)
 "Persona Grata" (April 29, 2020)
 "Behind the Mask" (August 31, 2021)

With New Sodmy
 Confess to a Crime (2002)
 Confess to a Love (2002)

References

 http://www.jpopasia.com/celebrity/kamijo/
 http://nerimaku.altervista.org/kamijo.htm
 http://gyao.yahoo.co.jp/ct/music/
 http://www.oricon.co.jp/prof/artist/14373/profile/full/
 https://web.archive.org/web/20131203030511/http://www.jame-world.com/us/artists-biography-36-lareine.html

External links

 Kamijo's Official Fan Club Website "Rose Croix"
 Kamijo at Metal Archives

Versailles (band) members
Visual kei musicians
Japanese male singer-songwriters
Japanese heavy metal singers
Japanese male rock singers
Japanese male pop singers
Japanese male models
Japanese male actors
Living people
1975 births
People from Hiratsuka, Kanagawa
Musicians from Kanagawa Prefecture